This is a list of mountains and hills in Saint Helena, Ascension, and Tristan da Cunha, the British Overseas Territory, listed by height.

List of mountains and hills

Over 1000m

750m to 1000m

500m to 750m

250m to 500m

50m to 250m

Other hills and hill features
NB: Many of these hills and features are over 200m.

Maps

See also

Geography of Saint Helena
Geography of Tristan da Cunha

External links
Google Terrain map of St Helena

Sources
Gizimap.hu: St Helena & Dependencies (2011)

Geology of Saint Helena, Ascension and Tristan da Cunha
Mountains
Mountains
Saint Helena
.Mountains
.Mountains
.Mountains
Saint Helena
Volcanoes of Saint Helena, Ascension and Tristan da Cunha